Knud Ditlevsen (14 April 1925 – 3 October 2006) was a Danish sprint canoeist who competed in the late 1940s. He finished fourth in the K-1 10000 m event at the 1948 Summer Olympics in London.

References
Knud Ditlevsen's profile at Sports Reference.com

1925 births
2006 deaths
Canoeists at the 1948 Summer Olympics
Danish male canoeists
Olympic canoeists of Denmark